Countess Maria Ludwika Krasińska (24 March 1883 - 23 January 1958) was a Polish noblewoman, major heiress and landowner, and a significant art collector. Her art collection was the origin of the Krasinski Museum.

Maria was married to Prince Adam Ludwik Czartoryski on August 31, 1901 in Warsaw.

1883 births
1958 deaths
Maria Ludwika